Self-service is the practice of serving oneself, usually when making purchases. Aside from Automated Teller Machines, which are not limited to banks, and customer-operated supermarket check-out, labor-saving of which has been described as self-sourcing, there is the latter's subset, selfsourcing and a related pair: End-user development and End-user computing.

Note has been made how paid labor has been replaced with unpaid labor, and how reduced professionalism and distractions from primary duties has reduced value obtained from employees' time.

Over a period of decades, laws have been passed both facilitating and preventing self-pumping of gas  and other self-service.

Overview
Self-service is the practice of serving oneself, usually when purchasing items. Common examples include many gas stations, where the customer pumps their own gas rather than have an attendant do it (full service is required by law in New Jersey, urban parts of Oregon, most of Mexico, and Richmond, British Columbia, but is the exception rather than the rule elsewhere). Automatic Teller Machines (ATMs) in the banking world have also revolutionized how people withdraw and deposit funds; most stores in the Western world, where the customer uses a shopping cart in the store, placing the items they want to buy into the cart and then proceeding to the checkout counter/aisles; or at buffet-style restaurants, where the customer serves their own plate of food from a large, central selection.

Patentable business method
In 1917, the US Patent Office awarded Clarence Saunders a patent for a "self-serving store." Saunders invited his customers to collect the goods they wanted to buy from the store and present them to a cashier, rather than having the store employee consult a list presented by the customer, and collect the goods.  Saunders licensed the business method to independent grocery stores; these operated under the name "Piggly Wiggly."

Electronic commerce
Self-service is over the phone, web, and email to facilitate customer service interactions using automation. Self-service software and self-service apps (for example online banking apps, web portals with shops, self-service check-in at the airport) become increasingly common.

Self-sourcing 

Self-sourcing is a term describing informal and often unpaid labor that benefits the owner of the facility where it is done by replacing paid labor with unpaid labor.

Selfsourcing (without a dash) is a subset thereof, and refers to developing computer software intended for use by the person doing the development.

Both situations have aspects of Self-service, and where permitted involve benefits to the person doing the work, such as job & personal satisfaction, even though tradeoffs are frequently involved, including long term losses to the company.

Doing someone else's job
When a loan officer is asked to "self-source" they're taking on a responsibility that's not one of the top seven "Loan Officer Job Duties" listed by a major job placement service.

A situation where no payment is made is self-service, such as airport check-in kiosks and checkout machines. International borders have also experimented with traveler-assisted fingerprint verification.

Another situation is where a company's Human resources department is partially bypassed by departments that "source talent themselves."

History of self-sourcing
An early use of the term is a 2005 HRO Today article titled "Insourcing, Outsourcing? How about Self-sourcing?" that mined Wikipedia's history of a pair of banks that merged decades ago as Standard Chartered and, after September 11, rebuilt its personnel department in an innovative way.

The concept is similar to self-service, and one USA example is pumping gas: New Jersey banned customers from doing this in 1949; now NJ is the only state "where drivers are not allowed to pump their own gasoline."

Self-service
In 1994 it was considered a radical change to propose permitting self-service at the gas pumps, in Japan, and the New York Times reported that "the push .. (came) from Japanese big business ... trying to cut costs."

Automatic Teller Machines are another example, and their expansion beyond banks have led
to signs saying Access To Money, which refers to a company with that name; the technology began over half-a-century ago.

Selfsourcing
Selfsourcing is the internal development and support of IT systems by knowledge workers with minimal contribution from IT specialists, and has been described as essentially outsourcing development effort to the end user. At times they use in-house Data warehouse systems, which often run on mainframes.

Various terms have been used to describe end user self service, when someone who is not a professional programmer programs, codes, scripts, writes macros, and in other ways uses a computer in a user-directed data processing accomplishment, such as End user computing and End user development.
In the 1990s, Windows versions of mainframe packages were already available.

Data sourcing 
When desktop personal computers became nearly as widely distributed as having a work phone, in companies having a data processing department, the PC was often unlinked to the corporate mainframe, and data was keyed in from printouts. Software was for do-it-yourself/selfsourcing, including spreadsheets, programs written in DOS-BASIC or, somewhat later, dBASE. Use of spreadsheets, the most popular End-user development tool, was estimated in 2005 to done by 13 million American employees.

Some data became siloed Once terminal emulation arrived, more data was available, and it was more current.  Techniques such as Screen scraping and FTP reduced rekeying. Mainframe products such as FOCUS were ported to the PC, and Business Intelligence (BI) software became more widespread.

Companies large enough to have mainframes and use BI, having departments with analysts and other specialists, have people doing this work full-time.  Selfsourcing, in such situations, is taking people away from their main job (such as designing ads, creating surveys, planning advertising campaigns); pairs of people, one from an analysis group and another from a "user" group, is the way the company wants to operate.  Selfsourcing is not viewed as an improvement.

Data warehouse was an earlier term in this space.

Issues
It is crucial for the system's purposes and goals to be aligned with that of the organizational goals. Developing a system that contradicts organizational goals will most likely lead to a reduction in sales and customer retention. As well, due to the large amount of time it may take for development, it is important allocate your time efficiently as time is valuable.

Knowledge workers must also determine what kind of external support they will require. In-house IT specialists can be a valuable commodity and are often included in the planning process.

It is important to document how the system works, to ensure that if the developing knowledge workers move on others can use it and even attempt to make needed updates.

Advantages
Knowledge workers are often strongly aware of their immediate needs, and can avoid formalizations and time needed for "project cost/benefit analysis" and delays due to chargebacks.

Additional benefits are:
 Improved requirement determination: Since they're telling themselves what they want, rather than someone else, this eliminates telling an IT specialist what they want. There is a greater chance for user short-term satisfaction.
 Increased participation and sense of ownership: Pride and self-push will add desire for completion, sense of ownership and higher worker morale. Increased morale can be infectious and lead to great benefits in several other areas.
 Facilitates speed of systems development: Since step-by-step details preclude formal documentation, time and resources are concentrated, whereas working with an IT specialists analyzing would be counterproductive. Selfsourcing is usually faster for smaller projects that do not require the full process of development.

Disadvantages

Inadequate expertise
Many knowledge workers involved in selfsourcing do not have experience or expertise with IT tools, resulting in:
Pride of ownership has been found to be a major cause of overlooking errors.
 A 1992 study showed that because Excel "tends to produce output even in the presence of errors" there is "user over-confidence in program correctness."
 Lost hours and potential: potentially good ideas are lost. These incomplete projects, after consuming many hours, often draw workers away from their primary duties. 
 Lack of organizational focus: These often form a privatized IT system, with poor integration to corporate systems. Data silos may violate policy and even privacy/HIPPA/HIPAA laws. Uncontrolled and duplicate information can become stale, leading to more problems than benefits.
 Lack of design alternative analysis: Hardware and software opportunities are not analyzed sufficiently, and efficient alternatives may not be noticed and utilized. This can lead to inefficient and costly systems.
 Lack of security: End users, as a group, do not understand how to build secure applications.
 Lack of documentation: Knowledge workers may not have supervisors who are aware that, as time goes on, changes will be needed and these compartmentalized systems will require the help of IT specialists. Knowledge workers will usually lack experience with planning for these changes and the ability to adapt their work for the future.

Shadow IT

Although departmental computing has decades of history, one-person-show situations either suffer from inability to interact with a helpdesk or fail to benefit from wheels already invented.

Self-service tools
Although self-service tools are also used by professionals, among the basic members of various categories from a more detailed list of self-service tools are:
 simple office equipment - even in a "paperless office" individual office workers use scotch tape dispensers, staplers and staple-removers. The New York Times mentions their applicability to Home Office businesses.
 hand-operated tools - screwdrivers, pliers, wrenches, hammers, handsaws
 mechanized/power hand-held tools - power drill, power saw
  - Microsoft Word, Powerpoint, Excel, dBase (or Access) represent areas of functionality used for knowledge management, both in finding stored information and in entering new content.  of these exist both for locally stored (desktop computer) programs and internet/cloud-based.
 self-service kiosks - interactive kiosks have become common in industries like QSR, transportation, hospitality, healthcare, cannabis, and more. They serve applications like self-ordering, check-in, ticketing, wayfinding, and more.

Human resource departments have enabled Employee self-service, including providing employees with tools for skill building and career planning.

See also

 Automated retail
 Automated teller machine
 Decision support system
 Expert system
 Insourcing
 Interactive kiosk
 Self checkout
 Shadow work
 Ticket machine
 Unmanned store
 Vending machine

External links
 https://oemkiosks.com/?page=qsr
Stephen Haag, Maeve Cummings, Donald McCubbrey, Alain Pinsonneault and Richard Donovan  Third Canadian Edition Management Information Systems for the Information Age Mcgraw-Hill Ryerson, Canada, 2006

References

Software distribution
Information systems
Decision support systems
Retail formats
Outsourcing
Business terms